This is a list of members elected to the eleventh Parliament of Uganda (2021 to 2026) in the 2021 Ugandan general election. It was preceded by the tenth Parliament (2016 to 2021).

List of members

References 

 
 
 
 

Politics of Uganda
Lists of political office-holders in Uganda
Uganda